Jennifer O'Connell  (born 1983) is a Canadian Liberal politician, who was elected to represent the riding of Pickering—Uxbridge in the House of Commons of Canada in the 2015 federal election.

O'Connell attended the University of Toronto, where she earned a degree in political science. She then clerked at a law firm specializing in labour relations, and became involved in municipal politics in Pickering. In 2006, she was elected to the city council representing Ward 1. She was re-elected in 2010 and 2014, and at the time of her election to the House of Commons was serving as the city's deputy mayor. In March 2014 she had been approached by the local Liberal riding association about serving as their candidate in the upcoming federal election, and initially declined, intending to focus on her re-election at the municipal level. Following the municipal elections in October 2014, she was approached again, and agreed to seek the nomination, which she won in January 2015.

Electoral record

References

External links

 Official Website

Living people
Liberal Party of Canada MPs
Members of the House of Commons of Canada from Ontario
Women members of the House of Commons of Canada
Ontario municipal councillors
People from Pickering, Ontario
Women in Ontario politics
University of Toronto alumni
21st-century Canadian politicians
21st-century Canadian women politicians
1983 births